Bâgé-le-Châtel is a commune in the Ain department in eastern France.

History
The name of Bâgé-le-Châtel comes from a Gallo-Roman villa belonging to a certain Balgiasius.

In the Middle Ages, three parishes were formed on the territory of the Seigneurs de Bâgé: Bâgé-le-Châtel around the chateau, Saint-André where the church was built, and Bâgé-la-Ville, the largest town.

Bâgé-le-Châtel is the ancient capital of Bresse. In 1272, Bresse became part of Savoy when Sibylle de Bâgé, sole heir, married Amadeus V, Count of Savoy. Bourg (today Bourg-en-Bresse), a fortified bastion with 3400 inhabitants, became the capital of Bresse. Bâgé remained a village, whereas Bourg expanded beyond its walls to become the city of today.

Population

See also
Communes of the Ain department

References

Communes of Ain
Ain communes articles needing translation from French Wikipedia
Bresse